PPE may refer to:

Science and technology
 Personal protective equipment, against injury or infection
 Palmoplantar erythema, peeling of skin from the palms
 Perturbed physics ensemble, or perturbed parameter ensemble, climate ensembles in climate change research
 Polyphenyl ether, a class of polymers
 Poly(p-phenylene oxide), a high-temperature thermoplastic
 Power and Propulsion Element, a solar electric Lunar Gateway space station module
 Premium Platform Electric, a modular car platform

Medicine
 Pruritic papular eruption of HIV disease
 Preparticipation physical evaluation, a physical examination of an athlete

Computing
 Power Processing Element, a PowerPC implementation
 PCBoard Program Executable, for the PCBoard BBS

Other uses
Philosophy, politics and economics, an academic program
 Property, plant and equipment (PP&E) in accounting
 Mar de Cortés International Airport (IATA code), Mexico

See also
 European People's Party (EPP, French PPE)
 European People's Party group (EPP Group)